The papal conclave lasting from 14 December 1830 to 2 February 1831 resulted in the election of Cardinal Bartolomeo Cappellari, who took the name Gregory XVI, to succeed Pius VIII as pope.

Context
Pope Pius VIII died on Thursday, November 30, 1830, at the age of sixty-nine. On December 11, the Governor of Rome, Msgr. Benedetto Cappelletti, informed the cardinals that there was a conspiracy in Rome involving the Bonaparte nephews of Cardinal Joseph Fesch. One in custody had been released to the Russian minister, since his mother was the Russian-born Catharina of Württemberg. Fesch refused to ask his nephews to leave Rome. A paper bomb exploded under the windows of the conclave. The conclave opened in an atmosphere of high tension.

Description
When the conclave convened on December 14, some 45 of the 54 living cardinals participated; eight of whom were not Italian. Bartolomeo Pacca presided as Dean of the Sacred College.

Initially the chief candidates included Emmanuele De Gregorio and Bartolomeo Pacca, who had been papabili in the 1829 conclave, plus Giacomo Giustiniani, who was a long-serving papal diplomat but who was vetoed by King Ferdinand VII. Giustiniani had served as nuncio at Madrid and provoked the hostility of the Prime Minister in ecclesiastical matters, and Queen Christina regarding the succession.

From the first day of the scrutiny, which was the 15th, up to the 27th, the votes were fairly evenly divided between De Gregorio and Pacca.
However, it became clear eventually that neither of the unvetoed papabili could gain the support of two-thirds of the cardinals, and with Prince Klemens Wenzel von Metternich wanting a very strong Pope to hold firm against the flood of revolution haunting Europe at the time of the conclave, Giuseppe Albani, who led the Austrian faction and supported Pacca, intervened. He proposed Vincenzo Macchi, former nuncio in Paris, as his candidate, but few of the other cardinals saw Macchi as suitable for the papacy. Cardinal Joachim-Jean-Xavier d'Isoard was instructed by King Louis-Philippe of France to place a veto against the election of Macchi if necessary. Cardinal Tommaso Bernetti, who vied with Albani for the position of Secretary of State, threw his support to De Gregorio.

Cappellari appeared as an alternative to both De Gregorio and Macchi only when the conclave was well-advanced, but even though Albani worked against him, Cappellari eventually took the lead and won the election.

No conclave since has lasted as long as a week, but at the time no conclave since 1667 had lasted fewer than three weeks. The conclave took eighty-three ballots to deliver a two-thirds majority to a candidate, whereas no conclave since has taken more than fourteen.

Cappellari, then a Camaldolese priest and prefect of the Congregatio de Propaganda Fide, was also the last Pope not a bishop when elected.

References

1830 in the Papal States
1831 in the Papal States
Papal conclaves
1830 elections
1831 elections
1830 elections in Europe
1831 elections in Europe
19th-century Catholicism
1830 in Christianity
1831 in Christianity
December 1830 events
January 1831 events
February 1831 events
Pope Gregory XVI